Geremi Sorele Njitap Fotso (born 20 December 1978), known simply as Geremi, is a Cameroonian former footballer. He was a versatile player able to play at right back, right midfield or defensive midfielder, known for his power, pace, combative style and free-kick ability.

The most successful periods of Geremi's club career came at Real Madrid and Chelsea, winning the UEFA Champions League with the first and domestic honours with the latter.

Geremi earned 118 caps for Cameroon from 1996 to 2010, scoring 13 goals. He was a member of their squad for seven Africa Cup of Nations tournaments, winning in 2000 and 2002, as well as the World Cup in 2002 and 2010 and a gold medal at the 2000 Olympics.

Club career

Early career
Geremi was born in Bafoussam, Cameroon. Raised into a footballing family, Geremi was encouraged to remain focused on school by his father, a former player. But as duties for his club and national teams pulled him away from his studies, he eventually decided to pursue his playing career. Geremi gave up on studying for his university entrance exams and began playing professionally.

Geremi began his career with a local side in Bafoussam, Racing FC, in 1995. A first-division club in the Cameroon's MTN Elite One, Racing had won the league championship the year before 16-year-old Geremi arrived and won the league cup, the Cameroonian Cup, in his only season as a professional at the club.

Cerro Porteño
In 1996, Geremi received an offer from Cerro Porteño, which he took, after being scouted whilst playing for the Cameroon U21 national team in Brazil. Before Geremi arrived at Cerro Porteño, agent Pedro Aldave picked between Samuel Eto'o and Geremi to go to Paraguay and join the Asunción club. Geremi was 18 when he arrived at the club.

In 1997, Geremi was teammates with compatriot Cyrille Florent Bella, the Uruguayan Ricardo Bitancort, Brazilian Felippe Ximenes, and Paraguayans Diego Gavilan, Jorge Martín Núñez, Paulo da Silva, Aldo Bobadilla and Roberto Fernandez in Cerro Porteno's team. Geremi was the star of the title decider in Paraguay's 1997 Apertura Tournament, which Cerro Porteño lost.

He only disputed one tournament with Cerro Porteño during six months at the club,
 reportedly not adapting to Paraguayan football before emprending to travel to Turkey. Six months was enough for him to jump to European football. Geremi mentioned that in Paraguay he was too far from his family and wished to go to European football. He received an offer from Turkey, and immediately signed.

Gençlerbirliği
Geremi spent two seasons in Turkey with Gençlerbirliği, racking up 57 appearances, before a move to Real Madrid materialised for him. In Geremi's first season at Gençlerbirligi in 1997/98, he was teammates with compatriot Tobie Mimboe, who was also a footballer at Cerro Porteño before this.

Real Madrid
In his three years at the Santiago Bernabéu Stadium, Geremi won two Champions League winners medals with the Spanish giants. He scored two goals whilst at Madrid; his first was a late winner in a 2000 FIFA Club World Championship tie against Raja Casablanca after his side had been reduced to eight men. His second came against Bayern Munich in the quarter-finals of the 2001–02 UEFA Champions League. At Real Madrid, Geremi was nominated for the Ballon d'Or of 2000. In a tribute to Geremi, four years after he left the club, former Real Madrid coach Vicente del Bosque told Spanish newspaper Marca, that Njitap and Steve McManaman were the two most important players in his squad, because "together they kept the whole team united".

Seeking more regular football, Geremi moved to Middlesbrough for the 2002–03 season on a season-long loan from Real Madrid, where he enjoyed a successful season.

In 2003, a sentence from FIFA obliged Cerro Porteño to pay Geremi US$450,000.

Chelsea

After an impressive FIFA Confederations Cup campaign with Cameroon, Chelsea paid Real Madrid £6.9 million for him in July 2003, and he went on to have an excellent first season at Stamford Bridge. Although towards the end of his career at Chelsea, under José Mourinho he was played less regularly and when he was played he was put in his unpreferred position of right-back. Geremi, however, was held in high regard by Mourinho. During an interview, he said about Geremi, "In my team I love to have Geremi on the bench because he's a low-profile player who is ready to help, ready to fight for the team, ready to do the job I want him to do. If I need him to play right-back, he can play right-back. If I need him to play right-winger, he can play right-winger. If I need him to pick up a man and mark him out of the game, he does it." In his final year at Chelsea, Geremi scored the winning goal in a home match against West Ham United, a long-range free-kick. This turned out to be his last goal in a Chelsea shirt. His final appearance for Chelsea came against Liverpool in the Champions League semi-final second leg, which went to penalties. Geremi came on as an extra-time substitute and went on to have his penalty saved by Liverpool goalkeeper Pepe Reina, and Chelsea ultimately lost.

During his time at Chelsea, the club won the Premier League in both 2004–05 and 2005–06, and Geremi was eligible for a winners' medal both seasons as he made 13 and 15 appearances respectively.

Newcastle United

2007–08

Geremi signed for Newcastle United on 6 July 2007 on a three-year deal, making him the fourth signing of the summer by manager Sam Allardyce. He was appointed club captain for the 2007–08 season by then manager Allardyce, but lost the armband after new manager Kevin Keegan awarded the captaincy to Michael Owen on 20 January 2008.

Geremi made his Newcastle debut on the opening day of the 2007–08 FA Premier League season in a 3–1 away win over Bolton Wanderers, going on to start the next six games for Newcastle before being an unused substitute in the League Cup third round defeat at Arsenal.

In January 2008, Geremi departed for the 2008 African Cup of Nations with Cameroon. He returned to Newcastle in February after Cameroon finished as runners-up. His first game since returning was on 23 February in a 5–1 away defeat to Manchester United. His first start since returning came on 17 March 2008 in a 1–1 draw away at Birmingham City.

Geremi scored his first goal for Newcastle in a 4–1 victory over Tottenham Hotspur at White Hart Lane on 30 March with a well-taken free-kick and the second a header in the 2–2 draw at Upton Park on 26 April against West Ham. Geremi made 27 league appearances for Newcastle United during his first season at the club, starting 24 of the 27 league games and scoring on two occasions, with five assists.

2008–09
Geremi made his first appearances of the 2008–09 Premier League season appearing as a half time substitute in a 1–0 home win over Bolton on 23 August 2008. In September 2008, Newcastle found themselves under yet another new manager. As a result, Geremi's game time dropped over the course of the season, with the midfielder making 11 league starts without a goal and contributing only three assists. Newcastle was relegated at the end of the season, finishing one point from safety after losing their final game of the season against Aston Villa.

In the 2009–10 season, Geremi's minutes dropped even more dramatically, with only three league starts in the first five months of the season. He scored his third Newcastle goal – and first of the 2009–10 club season – in a League Cup match against Huddersfield Town on 26 August 2009. Geremi left Newcastle in the 2010 January transfer window to join Turkish club MKE Ankaragücü. Shortly after, however, Newcastle said the deal had not been finalized and the player remained at Newcastle. On transfer deadline day, 1 February, Newcastle finally agreed to terms and Geremi went to Turkey on a new 18-month deal.

Ankaragücü
On 31 January 2010, Geremi's transfer to Ankaragücü of the Süper Lig was announced; he signed a one-and-a-half year contract with the Turkish club.

AEL
On 25 August 2010, Geremi moved to Superleague Greece club AE Larissa on a two-year contract. On 11 January 2011, it was announced on the official site of Larissa that the contract had been terminated.

International career
Geremi began his Cameroon international career with the youth teams, most notably in the 1995 U-20 Youth World Cup finals. Geremi started all four games for the national team before they lost to Argentina in the quarterfinals.

Geremi's senior debut came not much later, appearing in a match against Gabon in October 1996. From there, the midfielder went on to feature in four of Cameroon's six qualifiers for the 1998 FIFA World Cup, though he was left out of the finals squad after the nation qualified.

Geremi won Olympic Gold with Cameroon in Sydney in 2000 when he captained his country. He has also won two Africa Cup of Nations titles in 2000 and 2002 as they demonstrated their superiority not only in Africa but at world level too.

Geremi was part of the Cameroon side that qualified for the 2002 FIFA World Cup in Japan he also played in all three of Cameroon's World Cup final games in 2002 and scored a free-kick in a 2–2 friendly draw with England shortly before the tournament.

The squad failed to qualify for the 2006 World Cup, finishing one point behind qualifiers Ivory Coast in their table. Geremi started nine of the squad's ten games at holding midfielder, however, and scored twice during the campaign.

The 2008 Africa Cup of Nations brought Cameroon's best finish since 2002, managing to reach the finals before losing 1–0 to Egypt. Geremi again played every one of Cameroon's games and was named to the Team of the Tournament for his performances.

Geremi earned his 100th cap for Cameroon on 11 February 2009, scoring a goal as part of a 3–1 friendly win against Guinea in Paris, a game in which he scored from a free-kick.

Geremi played in 11 2010 World Cup qualification matches Cameroon finished top of Group A in the third round of qualification, scoring one goal along the way.

In January 2010, Geremi and his teammates traveled to Angola for the 2010 Cup of Nations, falling to eventual champions Egypt in a 3–1 extra time loss.

Geremi was part of the Cameroon squad that took part in the 2010 World Cup in South Africa. He played in all three of Cameron's matches as they finished bottom of Group E.

Personal life
Geremi's father, Samuel, is a former footballer and Cameroon international in the 1970s. Samuel, a striker, was nicknamed "Poison Arrow" for his powerful shot and free-kicks. Geremi's father was allowed five wives due to his status as a footballer, and Geremi has 17 siblings in Cameroon.

Geremi's cousin, Pierre Webó, was also a professional footballer, and played alongside Geremi for Cameroon at the 2010 FIFA World Cup.

Geremi speaks English, Spanish and Turkish.

Honours

Club
Racing Bafoussam
Cameroonian Cup: 1996

Real Madrid
La Liga: 2000–01
UEFA Champions League: 1999–2000, 2001–02

Chelsea
Premier League: 2004–05, 2005–06
FA Community Shield: 2005

Newcastle United
Football League Championship: 2009–10

International
Cameroon
Olympic Gold Medal: 2000
African Cup of Nations: 2000, 2002

Individual
 Africa Cup of Nations: Team of All Tournaments

Career statistics

Club

International

International goals

Notes

See also
List of men's footballers with 100 or more international caps

References

External links

 Geremi at playmakerstats.com (English version of ceroacero.es)
Premier League profile 

1978 births
Living people
1998 African Cup of Nations players
2000 African Cup of Nations players
2001 FIFA Confederations Cup players
2002 African Cup of Nations players
2002 FIFA World Cup players
2003 FIFA Confederations Cup players
2004 African Cup of Nations players
2006 Africa Cup of Nations players
2008 Africa Cup of Nations players
2010 Africa Cup of Nations players
2010 FIFA World Cup players
Athlitiki Enosi Larissa F.C. players
Association football defenders
Association football midfielders
Association football utility players
Cameroon international footballers
Cameroon under-20 international footballers
Cameroonian expatriate footballers
Cameroonian expatriate sportspeople in England
Cameroonian expatriate sportspeople in Greece
Cameroonian expatriate sportspeople in Paraguay
Cameroonian expatriate sportspeople in Spain
Cameroonian expatriate sportspeople in Turkey
Cameroonian footballers
Cerro Porteño players
Chelsea F.C. players
English Football League players
Expatriate footballers in England
Expatriate footballers in Greece
Expatriate footballers in Paraguay
Expatriate footballers in Spain
Expatriate footballers in Turkey
FIFA Century Club
Footballers at the 2000 Summer Olympics
Gençlerbirliği S.K. footballers
La Liga players
Medalists at the 2000 Summer Olympics
Middlesbrough F.C. players
MKE Ankaragücü footballers
Newcastle United F.C. players
Olympic footballers of Cameroon
Olympic gold medalists for Cameroon
Olympic medalists in football
People from Bafoussam
Premier League players
Real Madrid CF players
Süper Lig players
Super League Greece players
UEFA Champions League winning players